The Observer is an online newspaper serving Gladstone, Queensland in Australia.

The newspaper is owned by News Corp Australia and is published from Monday to Saturday.

The circulation of The Observer is 7,171 Monday to Friday and 9,701 on Saturday.

The Observer website is part of News Corp Australia's News Regional Media network.

History 
Prior to June 2020, The Observer was circulated to Gladstone and the area from the west to Biloela and south to Agnes Water and The Town Of 1770.

Along with many other regional Australian newspapers owned by NewsCorp, The Observer ceased print editions in June 2020 and became an online-only publication.

See also 
 List of newspapers in Australia

References

External links 
 The Gladstone Observer

Newspapers published in Queensland
Publications established in 1968
Gladstone, Queensland
APN Australian Regional Media
Daily newspapers published in Australia
Online newspapers with defunct print editions